Agatha Christie was a Soviet and Russian rock band. Formed in 1985 by Vadim Samoylov, Alexander Kozlov, and Peter Mai in Sverdlovsk. under the name VIA RTF UPI (Russian: ВИА РТФ УПИ) the band changed their name to Agatha Christie, after the detective fiction author, in 1988 and went on to become one of the most notable Russian rock acts in the mid to late 1990s. During the recording sessions for their debut album "Second Front", Vadim's younger brother, Gleb, became a full-time member of the band. The band lineup changed continuously since then, with the Samoylov brothers being bandleaders, swapping vocal duties. The Samoylov brothers have been the principal songwriters of the band, together with keyboardist Alexander Kozlov.

The band's music has spanned through a variety of genres across their albums, including gothic rock, post punk, alternative rock, psychedelic rock, glam rock, art rock and hard rock.

The band has released 10 studio albums, 5 compilation albums, 2 remix albums, 3 extended plays, and 18 music videos in their career. The band announced their breakup in 2009, embarking on a final tour across Russia and nearby countries. The band released their final album "Epilogue" in 2010, and played their final concert at the Nashestvie festival that same year.

After the dissolution of  Agatha Christie in 2010, the former lead singer Gleb Samoylov, together with keyboardist Konstantin Bekrev  and drummer Dmitry Khakimov, formed the group The Matrixx.

Discography

Honors and awards
1991: Grand Prix at the Festival of young European bands Open du Rock (Burgundy, France) 
 1996, 1997, 2001: Ovation
 1997: Golden Gramophone Award
 1998:  World Music Awards in the nomination  Successfully selling foreign artist  (Monte Carlo)
2004: Komsomolskaya Pravda, according to a survey of readers, Agatha Christie was the fourth most influential group in the history of Russian rock.

References

External links
 RIP
  Проект Триллер

Russian post-punk music groups
Russian alternative rock groups
Musical groups from Yekaterinburg
Musical groups from Moscow
Russian gothic rock groups
Russian psychedelic rock music groups
Musical groups established in 1988
Musical groups disestablished in 2010
Cultural depictions of Agatha Christie
Soviet rock music groups
Winners of the Golden Gramophone Award